Deacon of Death is a 2004 Dutch documentary film by film director Jan van den Berg and Willem van de Put and was produced by DRS Films.  The film introduces Sok Chea, a victim of the Khmer Rouge in Cambodia in the 70s, as she confronts Karoby, the man she remembers killing her family and others in their village when she was a child. Karoby has never been brought to trial and still lives in the village where the atrocities took place.

In 2004, the film had a fairly successful theatrical release and won the Golden Calf for best long documentary.

References

External links

Documentary films about the Cambodian genocide
Dutch documentary films
2004 films
2004 documentary films